The W. E. B. Du Bois Research Institute, formerly the  W. E. B. Du Bois Institute for African and African-American Research, is part of the Hutchins Center for African and African American Research located at Harvard University. Its main work is in the provision of fellowships to scholars studying a wide variety of topics relating to its central concerns, which are African and African American studies.

History
The W. E. B. Du Bois Institute for African and African-American Research was established in 1969. It is named after W. E. B. Du Bois, who was the first African American to receive a Ph.D. from Harvard University (1895).

The center was the basis for the foundation of the Hutchins Center for African & African American Research, and is now one of several institutes under the umbrella of this center.

Functions
The Institute awards up to twenty fellowships annually to scholars at various stages in their careers in the fields of African and African American studies to facilitate the writing of doctoral dissertations. The appointed fellows conduct individual research for a semester or two in fields broadly related to African and African American Studies. It has  supported more than 300 Fellows.

The institute co-hosts the W. E. B. Du Bois Society, an academic and cultural enrichment program for African American secondary school students, along with Ella J. Baker House in Dorchester, Boston. The society was founded by Jacqueline and Rev. Eugene C. Rivers, and its director  is Jacqueline O. Cooke Rivers.

Henry Louis Gates Jr. is the director of the institute.

References

External links
 

Harvard University research institutes
1969 establishments in Massachusetts
Black studies organizations
W. E. B. Du Bois